The Via Labicana was an ancient road of Italy, leading east-southeast from Rome. It seems possible that the road at first led to Tusculum, that it was then extended to Labici, and later still became a road for through traffic; it may even have superseded the Via Latina as a route to the southeast, for, while the distance from Rome to their main junction at Ad Bivium (or to another junction at Compitum Anagninum) is practically identical, the summit level of the former is  lower than that of the latter, a little to the west of the pass of Mount Algidus. After their junction it is probable that the road bore the name Via Latina rather than Via Labicana. The course of the road after the first six miles from Rome is not identical with that of any modern road, but can be clearly traced by remains of pavement and buildings along its course.

Via Labicana entered Rome through the Aurelian walls via the ancient monumental gate of Porta Prenestina, and reached, after an internal part, the Servian Wall, entering through the Porta Esquilina, decorated with the arch of Gallienus. The section of the road near Rome is now known as the Via Casilina. The remains of the Tomb of the Haterii can be found along this road. A statue of Augustus as pontifex maximus found at a villa of Livia on this road is known as the "Via Labicana type" and is housed at the National Roman Museum. The Roman Emperor Didius Julianus was buried by the fifth milestone on the Via Labicana, after being executed in 193.
The ancient church of Santi Marcellino e Pietro al Laterano was built at the intersection with via Merulana near the catacombs where the remains of St Marcellino and St Pietro were found.

Roman bridges 

See also 
Roman road
Roman bridge
Roman engineering

References

External links
Omnes Viae: Via Labicana on the Peutinger map

Labicana, Via
Labicana, Via